Peter Holst may refer to:

 Peter Fredrik Holst (1861–1935), Norwegian physician
 Peter Theodor Holst (1843–1908), Norwegian politician